Kellereischloss is a Schloss in Hammelburg, Lower Franconia, Bavaria, Germany. It is in the Baroque architectural style.

'Kellereischloss' might be translated into English as 'Wine Cellar Castle'. The building is colloquially known as Rotes Schloss ('Red Castle').

The site had been a wine cellar, and the seat of a tax collector, since 1279. The Prince-Abbot now desired a summer residence. It seems to have been to his satisfaction; for, in 1737, he died there.

References

 

Baroque architecture in Bavaria
Castles in Bavaria
Buildings and structures by Italian architects
Buildings and structures completed in 1731